Hillary Houston Hathaway (born September 12, 1969) is an American former professional baseball pitcher.

Career
Drafted by the California Angels in the 35th round of the 1989 Major League Baseball draft, Hathaway made his Major League Baseball debut with the Angels in September, 1992, pitching twice. He made eleven more pitching starts for the Angels in 1993.

On March 29, 1994, he was traded to the San Diego Padres for Harold Reynolds. He pitched for the Las Vegas Stars, the Padres top minor league affiliate in 1994. In 1995, his final professional season, he played for Las Vegas again and briefly for the Rancho Cucamonga Quakes.

External links

1969 births
Living people
American expatriate baseball players in Canada
Baseball players from Jacksonville, Florida
Boise Hawks players
California Angels players
Las Vegas Stars (baseball) players
Major League Baseball pitchers
Midland Angels players
Palm Springs Angels players
Quad Cities Angels players
Rancho Cucamonga Quakes players
SCF Manatees baseball players
State College of Florida, Manatee–Sarasota alumni
Vancouver Canadians players
Sandalwood High School alumni